Guillermo Viscarra Fabre, born June 23, 1900, in Sorata, dead 1980 in La Paz, was a Bolivian author, poet and pacifist.

Biography 
Viscarra Fabre was born and grew up in the village of Sorata, son of Francisco Viscarra and Carmela Fabre. He was one of Bolivia's most known poet and author during the 19th century. He wrote several books and anthologies during his lifetime. He also appeared in Bolivia's first silent film Wara Wara (1930).

Bibliography  

1916 – Halcón
1926 – Aruma
1926 – Los más mejores versos de los más peores poetas
1938 – Clima.
1941 – Poetas nuevos de Bolivia – La Paz 
1949 – Criatura del Alba
1966 – Nubladas nupcias 
1970 – El jardín de Nilda
1974 – Cordillera de sangre
1975 – Andes. Editorial Universitaria: Santiago – Chile 
1975 – Antología del cuento chileno-boliviano. Editorial Universitaria: Santiago – Chile

Filmography 
1930 – Wara Wara

References 
This article is partly based on material from the Spanish Wikipedia article: Guillermo Viscarra Fabre

Notes

1900 births
1980 deaths
20th-century Bolivian poets
20th-century male writers
Bolivian male film actors
Bolivian male poets